is a Japanese voice actress. Her major roles include Humiko Honma in Black Jack, Miyabi Tsukuyomi in Koi Koi Seven, and Aoi Mishina in Ryusei Sentai Mustumet. She voices Plusle in the Pokémon series.

Filmography

Anime

Video games

Overseas dubbing

Discography
 Ai no Senko (愛の閃光) – Meteor Squadron Musumet opening theme
 Super Love – Koi Koi Seven opening theme
 Ai no Hane(愛の羽根) – Koi Koi Seven character song

References

External links
 Official agency profile 
 Official agency profile (archive) 
  (archive) 
 

1980 births
Living people
Japanese video game actresses
Japanese voice actresses
Voice actresses from Tokyo